WTMS-CA, VHF analog channel 7, was a low-powered, Class A Telefutura-affiliated television station licensed to Minneapolis, Minnesota, United States. The station was owned by Silver Point Capital of Greenwich, Connecticut and was one of two Spanish language television stations in Minnesota, alongside sister station and Univision affiliate WUMN-LP (channel 13). It had air the Daystar Television Network, and been a ShopNBC affiliate.

On June 25, 2008, Equity disclosed that it was selling WTMS to Luken Communications, LLC.

Equity Media Holdings has been in chapter 11 bankruptcy since December 2008 and offers by Luken Communications to acquire Equity-owned stations in six markets have since been withdrawn.

WTMS was sold at auction to Silver Point Capital on April 16, 2009.  The sale closed on August 17, 2009; just a week later, on August 25, the station's license was canceled.  , however, WTMS-LD, a construction permit for a digital companion channel, remained active. This construction permit has since expired and the station is now listed as DWTMS, and is marked for deletion from the FCC database.

References

External links 

Television stations in Minneapolis–Saint Paul
Defunct television stations in the United States
Equity Media Holdings
Television channels and stations disestablished in 2009
UniMás network affiliates
Television channels and stations established in 2006
Spanish-language television stations in Minnesota
2006 establishments in Minnesota
2009 disestablishments in Minnesota
Defunct mass media in Minnesota